Deutsche Messe AG is the operating company for the Hanover Fairground, based in the city of Hanover, Germany. It is the largest trade fair operator in Germany and was founded in 1947. One of the main trade fairs held is Hannover Messe.

References

External links 

 Deutsche Messe homepage

Trade fairs in Germany
Entertainment companies established in 1947
Hanover
German companies established in 1947